Patrick J. Murphy (born January 2, 1857 in Auburn, Massachusetts – May 16, 1927 in Worcester, Massachusetts), was a Major League Baseball catcher from –. He played for the New York Giants.

External links

1857 births
1927 deaths
Major League Baseball catchers
New York Giants (NL) players
19th-century baseball players
Minor league baseball managers
Trenton Trentonians players
Newark Domestics players
Jersey City Jerseys players
Jersey City Skeeters players
Buffalo Bisons (minor league) players
Providence Grays (minor league) players
Worcester (minor league baseball) players
Baseball players from Massachusetts